Mariano de la Paz Graells y de la Agüera (1809 – 1898) was a Spanish entomologist notable for pioneering work on the insects of corpses.

Biography
Graells was born in Tricio, in the Province of Logroño. He died in Madrid where he had been professor of zoology.

The moth genus Graellsia and the Graells's tamarin are named after him.
He also identified the Iberian badger subspecies Meles meles marianensis.

Sources

 Anonym 1898: Graells, M. de la Paz. Entomologist's Monthly Magazine (3) 34

External links
Mariano Paz Graells

Spanish entomologists
People from La Rioja
1809 births
1898 deaths